The Papuan nightjar or Papuan eared-nightjar (Eurostopodus papuensis) is a species of nightjar in the family Caprimulgidae.  It is found in New Guinea.  Its natural habitats are subtropical or tropical moist lowland forests and subtropical or tropical mangrove forests.

References

Papuan nightjar
Birds of New Guinea
Papuan nightjar
Taxonomy articles created by Polbot